Narasimhaiah is a surname. Notable people with the surname include:

C. D. Narasimhaiah or Closepet Dasappa Narasimhaiah (1921–2005), Indian writer, literary critic and principal 
Hosur Narasimhaiah (1920–2005), Indian physicist, educator, writer

Indian surnames